Xiangling may refer to:

Xiangling, Shanxi, a town in Xiangfen County, Shanxi, China
Xiangling County, former name of Xiangfen County
Xiangling Township, Jinyang County, Sichuan, China
Xiangling (character), fictional maidservant in the Chinese novel Dream of the Red Chamber
Xiangling, a character voiced by Ari Ozawa in Genshin Impact